Elmshorn station is a railway station in Elmshorn in Schleswig-Holstein. Here the Hamburg-Altona–Kiel railway (R70) meets the Marsh Railway (R60). Elmshorn is also the terminus of the A3 line of the AKN Eisenbahn. That makes it the third-busiest station in Schleswig-Holstein. The Deutsche Bahn classifies it as a category 3 station and Elmshorn station is in the Hamburger Verkehrsverbund.

History
Elmshorn station was opened 18 September 1844, making it one of the oldest stations in the state. The Hamburg-Altona–Kiel railway should go through Barmstedt but as Elmshorn had more habitans the line went through it. Years ago there was a port railway that connected the station with the south of the harbour. It was replaced with trucks and the last tracks disappeared in 2002.

Traffic
The Regionalbahn-Schleswig-Holstein runs with trains to Neumünster, Itzehoe, Pinneberg, and Hamburg-Altona. A Regional-Express connects Hamburg Hauptbahnhof with Kiel Hauptbahnhof. The private company Nord-Ostsee-Bahn rides from Hamburg-Altona to Westerland on Sylt. The Schleswig-Holstein-Express rides from Hamburg Hbf to Flensburg. AKN trains run to Ulzburg-Süd. On Friday an Intercity-train rides from Flensburg to Berlin Südkreuz and Köln Hauptbahnhof. The IC to Köln runs on Sunday, too, as an historic train.

On track 1 run the trains to Kiel, Flensburg, Neumünster and Westerland and one Regionalbahn to Itzehoe. On track 2 and 3 run trains to Pinneberg, Hamburg and Itzehoe as well as the Intercitys. On track 1a runs the AKN. The bus station (ZOB (German for "Zentraler Omnibusbahnhof")) is located in front of the station.

Routes 
 Hamburg–Kiel (30.7 km)
 Elmshorn–Westerland (30.7 km)
 Elmshorn–Bad Oldesloe (0.0 km)
 Elmshorn port railway (0.0 km)

Lines

References

External links 
 SHLINK

Railway stations in Schleswig-Holstein
Railway stations in Germany opened in 1844